Suresh Chavhanke is an Indian journalist who is the current chairman, managing director (CMD) and the editor-in-chief of Sudarshan News (Sudarshan TV Channel Limited). He is the anchor of TV show bindas Bol.

Early life and career 
Suresh Chavhanke claims to be a member of Rashtriya Swayamsevak Sangh since the age of 3 years when he started attending its ceremonies. As a member of RSS, he had worked as a reporter of pro-RSS newspaper Tarun Bharat. He held several posts in RSS before becoming a full-time reporter. He launched Sudarshan News channel in 2005 in Pune and later shifted it to Noida. He is currently the chairman, managing director and editor-in-chief of Sudarshan news. He hosts the show Bindas Bol.

Legal issues 

 An FIR was lodged with Noida Police against Suresh Chavhanke for allegedly raping a former employee of his channel Sudarshan News in November 2016. He was booked by Police under 11 sections of the IPC; police had investigated the case but the charges were not substantiated as per the closure report filed by the Police in January 2017. Yati Narsinghanand Saraswati, convener of the Akhil Bhartiya Sant Parishad, alleged that complainant was under influence of Jihadist elements and claimed that they have solid proofs but can't disclose to media. Several organisations alleged that he was victimised because he stood up for 'Hindu cause'.

 In April 2017, Chavhanke was booked and later arrested for inciting communal hatred between the two communities. The residents of Uttar Pradesh had registered a complaint against Sudarshan News’ show ‘Bindaas Bol’, hosted by Chavhanke and had alleged that it aired programmes that promoted communal disharmony and hostility between religious groups. Subsequently, Chavhanke was booked under various IPC sections and section 16 of the Cable Television Network (Regulation) Act, 1955 was also invoked. After being released on bail, he claimed that it was an attempt to "suppress and intimidate media".

 In 2018, he started a Bharat Bachav rally allegedly to give a message on population control. The rally was interrupted by Hyderabad Police citing law and order problems created by the event. Later, yatra was continued by assurance of T. Raja Singh and they alleged that it was stopped due to pressure of AIMIM chief Asaduddin Owaisi.
 He was also in controversy after many people including 91 retired Civil servants filed case against him claiming that his programme 'Bindas Bol' contains derogatory statements about Muslim community and was divisive in nature, the programme related Muslims entering civil services to “infiltration” and “Jihad” in UPSC Exams which was paused by Allahabad High Court on 1 September 2020.

References

Indian broadcasters
1972 births
Living people
Rashtriya Swayamsevak Sangh members
People from Shirdi